Zoveydi-ye Ramezan (also Romanized as Zoveydī-ye Rameẕān; also known as Zobeydī-ye Rameẕān) is a village in Howmeh-ye Sharqi Rural District, in the Central District of Ramhormoz County, Khuzestan Province, Iran. At the 2006 census, its population was 91, in 21 families.

References 

Populated places in Ramhormoz County